Office wife may refer to:
Office wife, a wording for work spouse
 The Office Wife (1930 film), a 1930 American pre-Code romantic drama film
 The Office Wife (1934 film), a 1934 British comedy film